Dagfinn is a given name. Notable people with the given name include:

Dagfinn Aarskog (1928–2014), Norwegian physician
Dagfinn Aarskog (bobsleigh) (born 1973), Norwegian bobsledder
Dagfinn Bakke (1933–2019), Norwegian painter, illustrator and printmaker
Dagfinn Dahl (1887–1967), Norwegian barrister
Dagfinn Dekke (1908–1982), Norwegian jurist and civil servant
Dagfinn Flem (1906–1976), Norwegian politician, newspaper editor, non-fiction writer and translator
Dagfinn Føllesdal (born 1932), Norwegian-American philosopher
Dagfinn Gedde-Dahl (1937–2016), Norwegian physician
Dagfinn Grønoset (1920–2008), Norwegian journalist and writer
Dagfinn Habberstad (born 1941), Norwegian trade unionist and civil servant
Dagfinn Hauge (1908–2007), Norwegian writer and Lutheran bishop
Dagfinn Hjertenes (1943–2006), Norwegian politician
Dagfinn Høybråten (born 1957), Norwegian politician
Dagfinn Kjeholt (1912–2005), Norwegian naval officer
Dagfinn Koch (born 1964), Norwegian musician
Dagfinn Loen, Norwegian curler
Dagfinn Mannsåker (1916–1994), Norwegian archivist and historian
Dagfinn Næss (1934–2008), Norwegian boxer
Dagfinn Olsen, Norwegian orienteering competitor
Dagfinn Henrik Olsen (born 1966), Norwegian politician
Dagfinn Stenseth (1936–2019), Norwegian diplomat
Dagfinn Sundsbø (born 1946), Norwegian politician
Dagfinn Tveito (1927–2015), Norwegian magazine editor
Dagfinn Vårvik (1924–2018), Norwegian politician